General Aung San Shield (formerly MFF Cup) is the top football knockout tournament in Myanmar.

On 26 March 2014, MFF League Committee Meeting decides the knock-out cup (General Aung San Shield) winner would compete in Toyota Mekong Championship as well as earning the ticket for the AFC Cup. The tournament is currently sponsored by Military of Defence. Ayeyawady United are the most successful team after winning the tournament for the two consecutive times in 2012 and 2014. General Aung San Shield is a domestic cup of Myanmar Football Federation. Clubs from Myanmar National League 1 and all teams from Myanmar National League 2 take part in the competition. 2015 was the first season of the competition. Ten clubs from Myanmar National League 2 and two clubs from Myanmar National League plays from the first round of the competition and the 16 teams will play the second round. The winner played for the Quarter final. In the semi-final the teams are played home and away. The final will always be played at the Bogyoke Aung San Stadium. The winner is qualified for the AFC Cup. Except the Semi-Final the cup matches are played in Thuwanna Indoor Stadium and Aung San Stadium. The Champion will be awarded 300 000 000 Myanmar Kyats and the runner up will be awarded 150 million Myanmar kyats.

List of finals

References

 
1
Myanmar